The Bornean bulbul (Rubigula montis) is a member of the bulbul family of passerine birds. It is endemic to the island of Borneo.

Taxonomy and systematics

The Bornean bulbul was previously placed in genus Pycnonotus. This genus was found to be polyphyletic in recent molecular phylogenetic studies and five bulbul species, including the Bornean bulbul, moved to Rubigula.

Until 2008, the Bornean bulbul was considered as conspecific with the black-capped, black-crested, ruby-throated and flame-throated bulbuls. Some authorities have considered the Bornean bulbul to be a subspecies of the black-capped bulbul.

Description
The Bornean bulbul has a black crest, yellow throat, and brownish eyes.

Distribution and habitat
This is a bird of forest and dense scrub. It builds its nest in a bush; two to four eggs are a typical clutch.

Behaviour and ecology
The Bornean bulbul feeds on fruit and insects.

References

Rasmussen, P.C., and J.C. Anderton. (2005). Birds of South Asia. The Ripley Guide. Volume 2: Attributes and Status. Smithsonian Institution and Lynx Edicions, Washington D.C. and Barcelona.

Rubigula
Endemic birds of Borneo
Birds described in 1879